Isopar M is a nearly clear odorless petroleum distillate and solvent produced by ExxonMobil.  It is created from crude oil.  It has a flash point of more than 60 °C, and works as a forming fluid in metalworking, as a household cleaner, a household polisher, and a liquid vaporizer.   it is not available to the general public in its pure form, but may be found in the ingredients lists of some cleaning agents and solvents.

By weight, it consists of:

References

Hydrocarbon solvents